The Maine Island Trail is a recreational water trail that spans the entire coast of Maine, connecting over 200 islands and mainland sites available for day visits or overnight camping. The trail is operated by the Maine Island Trail Association (MITA), a non-profit membership organization based in Portland, Maine with over 6000 members. Trail properties are owned by private landowners, conservation organizations, and federal, state and municipal agencies, all of whom make their land available to MITA members in exchange for Leave No Trace use and careful stewardship. All sites are accessible by personal watercraft, such as sea kayaks, sailboats or powerboats.

Many sites are concentrated between Casco Bay and Mount Desert Island. MITA encourages members  and the public to protect and enjoy the wild islands of Maine.

Stewardship services include island cleanups, work projects, monitoring, and the removal of invasive species such as Japanese Knotweed, Black Swallowwort, Asiatic Bittersweet, Japanese Barberry, and Bush Honeysuckles.

The annual MITA Guidebook, distributed in the spring to MITA members, offers details on accessing all MITA sites. Most sites require no additional fees or reservations beyond initial membership dues. The Guidebook outlines basic paddling and boating safety guidelines, Leave No Trace principles, and comprehensive site descriptions. The Guide can also be downloaded as a mobile app. The app includes photos, anchorage locations, an interactive NOAA chart, launches & pumpouts. Anyone can download the app and access content, but only current MITA members have full access to all app features.

External links
 Maine Island Trail Association

References

Environment of Maine
Water trails